Ch'iyar Qullu (Aymara ch'iyara black, qullu mountain, "black mountain", also spelled Chiar Kkollu) is a  mountain in the Bolivian Andes. It lies in the La Paz Department, Murillo Province, Palca Municipality. Ch'iyar Qullu is situated north-east of the mountain Achachi Qala.

References 

Mountains of La Paz Department (Bolivia)